The South Korea national Baseball5 team represents South Korea in international Baseball5 competitions.

History
South Korea participated in the inaugural Baseball5 Asia Cup in Kuala Lumpur, where they finished third after winning the bronze medal game 2 matches to 0 against Hong Kong.

South Korea qualified for the 2022 Baseball5 World Cup held in Mexico City. The Korean team was eliminated in the first round after finishing 0–5. During the placement round, the team won two games and lost one game for a final record of 2–6, finishing in the tenth place of the championship.

Current roster

Staff

Tournament record

Baseball5 World Cup

Baseball5 Asia Cup

References

National baseball5 teams in Asia
Baseball5